Antolić is a Croatian surname. Notable people with the surname include:
 
Domagoj Antolić (born 1990), Croatian footballer
Čedo Antolić (1951–2019), Croatian poet and songwriter

See also
Antolin (name)

Croatian surnames